Wyndham Vale railway station is located on the Deer Park - West Werribee line in Victoria, Australia. It serves the western Melbourne suburbs of Wyndham Vale and Manor Lakes, and opened on 14 June 2015.

Built as part of the Regional Rail Link project, it was officially opened by Premier Daniel Andrews and the federal Minister for Infrastructure and Regional Development, Warren Truss, with services commencing on 21 June 2015.

A turnback siding is located between the two running lines just to the south of the station, used for peak hour terminating services from Melbourne. A stabling yard has also been built to the north of the station. Construction began in mid-2018, and the sidings were opened in April 2020.

Under the Western Rail Plan, announced by the Andrews State Government in 2018, the station will eventually become part of the metropolitan railway network.

Platforms and services
Wyndham Vale has two side platforms. It is served by V/Line Geelong line and selected Warrnambool line trains.

Platform 1: 
 services to Southern Cross
 weekend services to Southern Cross

Platform 2: 
 services to Geelong and Waurn Ponds
 weekend services to Warrnambool

Transport links
CDC Melbourne operate four bus routes via Wyndham Vale station, under contract to Public Transport Victoria:
: to Hoppers Crossing station
: to Werribee station
: Werribee station – Jubilee Estate (Wyndham Vale)
: to Werribee station

References

External links

Rail Geelong gallery

Railway stations in Melbourne
Railway stations in Australia opened in 2015
Railway stations in the City of Wyndham